Samuel George Smith (5 June 1822 – 6 July 1900) was an English banker and Conservative Party  politician who sat in the House of Commons from 1859 to 1880.

Smith was the grandson of Samuel Smith, Member of Parliament (MP) for Wendover from 1820 to 1832, and the son of Samuel George Smith (1789–1863) and his wife Eugenia Chatfield, daughter of the Rev. Robert Chatfield. He was educated at Rugby School and at Trinity College, Cambridge and became a partner in Smith, Payne & Smiths, bankers of London.  He was  a J.P. for Hertfordshire.

Samuel George Smith (père), George Robert Smith, and Oswald Augustus Smith, all members of that Lombard Street banking house, were in 1836 among the earliest and heaviest investors in "town acres" of the newly surveyed city of Adelaide, and country land in South Australia.

At the 1859 general election Smith was elected as one of the two MPs for Aylesbury. He held the seat until his defeat at the 1880 general election. He was a general supporter of Benjamin Disraeli's policy.

Smith lived at Sacombe Park, Ware, Hertfordshire. He died unmarried at the age of 78.

References

External links
 

1822 births
1900 deaths
People educated at Rugby School
Alumni of Trinity College, Cambridge
UK MPs 1859–1865
UK MPs 1865–1868
UK MPs 1868–1874
UK MPs 1874–1880
Conservative Party (UK) MPs for English constituencies
People from Ware, Hertfordshire
Samuel